Martin Luther King Middle School is the name of these public school in the United States:

 Martin Luther King Middle School (Berkeley)
 Martin Luther King Middle School (Kansas City)
 Martin Luther King Jr. Middle School, in Richmond, Virginia
 Martin Luther King Jr. Middle School (Germantown, MD)
 Martin Luther King Jr. Middle School, part of Hayward Unified School District in Hayward, California

See also
 Martin Luther King (disambiguation)
 Lycée Martin Luther King (disambiguation) for schools France named after King
 Martin Luther King High School (disambiguation)